The 2007 Wagner Seahawks football team represented Wagner College in the 2007 NCAA Division I FCS football season as a member of the Northeast Conference (NEC). The Seahawks were led by 27th-year head coach Walt Hameline and played their home games at Wagner College Stadium. Wagner finished the season 7–4 overalland 3–3 in NEC play to place in a three-way tie for third.

Schedule

References

Wagner
Wagner Seahawks football seasons
Wagner Seahawks football